Dexter Lamar Jackson (born July 28, 1977) is an American former professional football player who was a safety in the National Football League (NFL). He was drafted by the Tampa Bay Buccaneers in the fourth round of the 1999 NFL Draft. He played college football at Florida State.

Jackson won a Super Bowl with the Buccaneers when the team defeated the Oakland Raiders in Super Bowl XXXVII; he was also named Super Bowl MVP. Jackson played for the Arizona Cardinals and Cincinnati Bengals as well.

College career
Jackson attended Florida State University and was a Human Science Major and a letterman in football. In football, he was named as an All-Atlantic Coast Conference as a junior, and he finished his college football career with 194 tackles, 7 interceptions, 16 passes defensed, one forced fumble, one fumble recovery, and blocked four field goals.

Professional career

First stint with Buccaneers
Jackson was drafted by the Tampa Bay Buccaneers in the fourth round (113th overall) of the 1999 NFL draft. He made his NFL debut versus the Denver Broncos.

Jackson was the MVP of Super Bowl XXXVII, recording two interceptions. He was the first safety to win the award since Jake Scott in 1973, the third defensive back overall (joining Scott and Larry Brown).

Arizona Cardinals
The Super Bowl win came just before Jackson declared for free agency. The Pittsburgh Steelers had a verbal agreement to sign Jackson; however, he backed out at the last minute and signed with the Arizona Cardinals instead. The Steelers then went to "Plan B" and drafted Troy Polamalu.

Second stint with Buccaneers
Jackson rejoined the Buccaneers in 2004, and played with them until the end of the 2005 season.

Cincinnati Bengals
Before the 2006 season Jackson signed with the Cincinnati Bengals as a free agent. He played three seasons with the team before being released on March 6, 2009.

Florida Tuskers
Jackson finished his professional career with the Florida Tuskers of the United Football League. Jackson was among several former Buccaneers on the Tuskers' inaugural roster and played for the team for the 2009 season before retiring.

Coaching career
Jackson has coached in the greater Atlanta area with CoachUp, a private coaching service.

Broadcasting career
On September 19, 2011, Dexter Jackson and former World Boxing Organization cruiserweight world champion Tyrone Booze began a new radio show called "All Sports" with Randy Harris on Clearwater, Florida's WTAN AM 1340. The show has also aired on WDCF, WZHR and online on the Talking Sports Network.

Personal life
Jackson is married to Tina Jackson (of Miami, FL) and has four daughters: Jazmine, Daisia, Meah, and Taylor. Jackson serves as Youth & Recreation Manager for the Tampa Housing Authority, a non-profit organization in Tampa.

NFL career statistics

References

1977 births
Living people
People from Quincy, Florida
American football safeties
African-American players of American football
Florida State Seminoles football players
Tampa Bay Buccaneers players
Super Bowl MVPs
Arizona Cardinals players
Cincinnati Bengals players
Florida Tuskers players
Players of American football from Florida
21st-century African-American sportspeople
20th-century African-American sportspeople